Theranostics is a biweekly peer-reviewed open access medical journal established in January 2011 and published by Ivyspring International Publisher. The editor-in-chief is Xiaoyuan Chen (National Institute of Biomedical Imaging and Bioengineering). It covers biomedical research of interest for theranostics.

Abstracting and indexing
The journal is abstracted and indexed in:

According to the Journal Citation Reports, the journal has a 2020 impact factor of 11.556.

References

External links 
 

Ivyspring International Publisher journals
English-language journals
Monthly journals
Publications established in 2011
Creative Commons-licensed journals
General medical journals